= Amirhossein Mehmandoust =

Iranian taekwondo practitioner (born 2002)

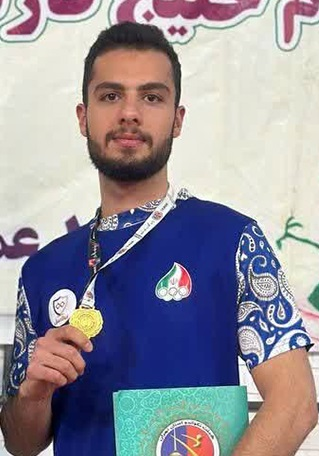

Personal information
- Nationality: Iranian
- Born: 11 August 2002 (age 24) Tehran
- Height: 189 cm (6 ft 2 in)
- Weight: 74 kg (163 lb)

Sport
- Sport: Taekwondo

Amirhossein Mehmandoust (born 11 August 2002) is an Iranian Taekwondo athlete who currently plays for the Iran national taekwondo team.
